Pretty Things is a 2005 documentary directed and starring Liz Goldwyn.

Overview
A look into the world of 20th century burlesque queens.  The film premiered on HBO and the Canadian Broadcasting Corporation in 2006. Following the documentary, Liz Goldwyn's first book, Pretty Things: The Last Generation of American Burlesque Queens, was published by HarperCollins.

References

External links

2005 films